Blood Stained Love Story is the fifth studio album by American rock band Saliva which was released on January 23, 2007. This is their first album with rhythm guitarist Jonathan Montoya after the departure of Chris D’Abaldo. The song "Ladies and Gentlemen" was the official theme song for the WWE PPV WrestleMania 23. It also has appeared on many other sporting event telecasts. The song "King Of The Stereo" was modified and featured as ESPN Varsity Inc's Theme song, under the name "King Of The Stadium" with appropriately edited lyrics. The original title for the album was The Rise & Fall Of The Glorified Kingdom.

The album debuted on the Billboard 200 at number 19, selling 31,000 copies in its first week.

Critical reception

PopMatters contributor Andrew Blackie was mixed about the record, calling it "one of the strongest entries in the nu-metal crew's catalog" for showing maturation in their musicianship and experimenting with different instruments but felt it defaults into either "redundancy or washout" to reveal their worst qualities on tracks that are just "slightly sappy and/or melodramatic" and contain "king-size cliché[s]" lyrics, saying that "[I]t's not the first option you'd want to check out if you're looking for the best of what's on radio, therefore; but if this is already your type of music and you're willing to sit through the plain awful among the tentatively good, then it may well satisfy." AllMusic's Stephen Thomas Erlewine noted how the album mixes their usual nu-metal techniques with "'90s heavy rock clichés" that emulate bands ranging from Nirvana ("Black Sheep"), Creed ("Starting Over") and Third Eye Blind ("Never Gonna Change"), and that it sounds like "a record designed to rule the charts in 2000 instead of 2007," concluding that "There's not much hunger here, but there is precision, along with a creeping sense of maturity in how they polish their craft and now sound more comfortable with power ballads than they do with hard rockers." Rolling Stones Christian Hoard said, "The fourth album from this Memphis quintet rocks like a motherfucker, tosses in atmospheric keys and shimmery sound effects, and drops a couple of slow ones. But there's no remedy for crappy arena metal like "Ladies and Gentlemen" and mushy radio filler like "Starting Over."" A writer for Alternative Addiction compared the record negatively to their 2002 effort Back into Your System, saying the songs weren't as heartfelt and passionate than the ones found on that record and was too simplistic by going back to the "style over substance" days of Every Six Seconds, concluding that "Saliva takes a big step backwards with Blood Stained Love Story, but let’s hope they recover to old form. This band can produce great albums with lots of hits. It just didn’t happen this time around."

Track listing
All songs by Saliva and Bob Marlette. 

Best Buy sold a limited edition version of Blood Stained Love Story that includes a bonus disc with the following bonus tracks:

Credits
Credits adapted from album’s liner notes.

Saliva
Josey Scott - lead vocals
Wayne Swinny - lead guitar, backing vocals
Jonathan Montoya - rhythm guitar, backing vocals
Dave Novotny - bass, backing vocals
Paul Crosby - drums

Production
Bob Marlette — producer, engineer, mixing
Sid Riggs — Pro Tools, editing, electronic sound design
Howie Weinberg — mastering

Chart positions
Album

Singles

References

2007 albums
Saliva (band) albums
Island Records albums
Albums produced by Bob Marlette